Yablonka is a rural locality (a selo) in Sizobugorsky Selsoviet of Volodarsky District, Astrakhan Oblast, Russia. The population was 425 as of 2010. There are 2 streets.

Geography 
Yablonka is located 42 km southwest of Volodarsky (the district's administrative centre) by road. Akhterek is the nearest rural locality.

References 

Rural localities in Volodarsky District, Astrakhan Oblast